Kesatuan Gurita (Octopus Squad) is an Indonesian Navy task force unit based in Jakarta. Their primary role is offshore counter-terrorism against shipping and oil installations. The units draws its troops from Indonesian Marine Corps soldiers.

References

External links
 SpecialOperations.Com 
 www.armada.ch  

Indonesian Navy